Balloch Pier railway station was a railway station serving the southern end of Loch Lomond on the northern edge of Balloch, Scotland.

It was closed on 28 September 1986 as a result of the 1984 Strathclyde Rail Review. The steamer service on Loch Lomond provided by the  had ceased  in 1981. Rail services had been provided to connect with sailings.

Following closure the station was demolished and there is now a car park on the site.

References

Notes

Sources

External links
Video footage of Balloch Pier Station

Disused railway stations in West Dunbartonshire
Former Dumbarton and Balloch Railway stations
Railway stations in Great Britain opened in 1850
Railway stations in Great Britain closed in 1986
1850 establishments in Scotland
1986 disestablishments in Scotland
Vale of Leven